United Montenegro (UCG) is a conservative political party in Montenegro. Party founder and de facto political leader is Goran Danilović, former Minister of Interior Affairs in Government of Montenegro.

History
The United Montenegro was founded in September 2017 when the conservative faction of Democratic Alliance (DEMOS) led by party vice-president Goran Danilović split and formed a new political party due to disagreements with party leader Miodrag Lekić. It currently has two representatives in the Parliament of Montenegro - both elected in 2016 from DEMOS-lead Key Coalition electoral list.

On 1 May 2019, the United Montenegro decided to sign an agreement with Socialist People's Party (SNP), Workers' Party (RP) and Independent parliamentary group to form a new catch-all political alliance under the name For the Benefit of All (Da svako ima). 

Alliance eventually dissolved prior the parliamentary election in August 2020. In July 2020 United Montenegro, jointly with the Workers' Party and Independent group in the parliament (composed of former members of SNP and DEMOS parties), agreed to form a new cultural conservative political alliance under the name Popular Movement (NP), employing a more significant cultural and socially conservative discourse, supporting 2019-2020 clerical protests in Montenegro and Serbian Orthodox Church rights in Montenegro, continuing its activity within the joint electoral list with Democratic Front and the SNP.

Electoral performance

Parliamentary elections

Presidential elections

 Independent candidate, support

References

2017 establishments in Montenegro
Political parties established in 2017
Serb political parties in Montenegro
Conservative parties in Montenegro
Pro-European political parties in Montenegro